The 1986 Knowsley North by-election was a parliamentary by-election held on 13 November 1986 for the British House of Commons constituency of Knowsley North.

The Labour Party retained the seat with just over half of the votes, while the SDP-Liberal Alliance surged to achieve more than a third of the vote. The constituency had some of the highest levels of unemployment in the United Kingdom.

There was a 14% swing from Labour to the Alliance, continuing a trend in by-elections, with the local Militant Tendency harming the Labour vote in by-elections on Merseyside (see especially Liverpool Walton).

Previous MP 
The seat had become vacant on 1 October 1986. The constituency's Labour Member of Parliament (MP), Robert Kilroy-Silk, resigned his seat to pursue a media career. He did this by being appointed Steward of the Manor of Northstead, a notional office of profit under the Crown, which is used to permit MPs to vacate their seats.

Kilroy-Silk had been an MP since the February 1974 general election, originally sitting for Ormskirk. That seat disappeared in a redistribution, and he moved to the new constituency of Knowsley North in 1983.

He returned to politics in 2004, becoming a Member of the European Parliament (MEP) for the East Midlands, initially representing the United Kingdom Independence Party.

Candidates 
Six candidates were nominated. The list below is set out in descending order of the number of votes received at the by-election.

1. Representing the Labour Party was George Howarth. He was Chief Executive of the Wales Trades Union Congress Centre in Cardiff, and had been deputy leader of Knowsley Metropolitan Borough Council from 1982 to 1983.

He has been a Labour Member of Parliament since the 1986 by-election, originally for Knowsley North until 1997, then for its replacement Knowsley North and Sefton East, and since 2010 for Knowsley.

2. The Liberal Party candidate, representing the SDP-Liberal Alliance, was Rosie Cooper. She had been a member of Liverpool City Council since 1973, and worked as a junior executive at Littlewoods. Cooper had contested the seat of Liverpool Garston at the 1983 general election. She has represented West Lancashire since 2005, having joined the Labour Party in 1999.

3. The Conservative candidate was Roger Brown, a barrister born in 1951. He was a member of Bury Metropolitan Borough Council from 1982 until 1986.

4. David Hallsworth stood for election as a candidate of the Revolutionary Communist Party led by Frank Furedi.

5. George Weiss, a frequent election candidate, was an Independent using the ballot paper label "Rainbow Alliance Captain Rainbows Universal Party".

6. Robert Cory was an Independent candidate.

Result 

Note a Change is calculated from the SDP candidate who represented the SDP-Liberal Alliance at the 1983 general election.

See also
 Knowsley North constituency
 List of United Kingdom by-elections
 United Kingdom by-election records

Sources

 Britain Votes/Europe Votes By-Election Supplement 1983-, compiled and edited by F.W.S. Craig (Parliamentary Research Services 1985)

Knowsley North by-election
Knowsley North by-election
Knowsley North by-election
Politics of the Metropolitan Borough of Knowsley
By-elections to the Parliament of the United Kingdom in Merseyside constituencies
1980s in Merseyside